Alireza Mashayekhi is an Iranian musician, composer, conductor and academic. He is one of the first composers in Iran to represent avant-garde, modern and contemporary music. He is a pioneer of electroacoustic music in Iran.

Early life
Mashayekhi was born in Tehran in 1940. After graduating from the University of Music and Performing Arts, Vienna, he went to Utrecht, the Netherlands, to study electronic and computer music, and attended lectures by Gottfried Michael Koenig.

Career
In 1993, with cooperation of the pianist Farima Ghavam-Sadri, Mashayekhi founded the Tehran Contemporary Music Group. In 1995 he established the Iranian Orchestra for New Music, which released its first recording in 2002 on Hermes Records.

In 2007, Sub Rosa (label) released Persian Electronic Music: Yesterday and Today 1966–2006, a double-disc anthology that includes works by Mashayekhi and Ata Ebtekar. In 2009, Brandon Nickell’s Isounderscore label released the vinyl double LP Ata Ebtekar & The Iranian Orchestra for New Music Performing Works of Alireza Mashayekhi "Ornamental". Mashayekhi granted Ebtekar full creative freedom to work with the Iranian Orchestra for New Music to arrange and transform his compositions.

Musical language 
Mashayekhi's music circulates between a range of styles and genres, from classical compositions inspired by Persian rhythms and Iranian folk music that incorporate meditated repetition and polyphony, to atonal compositions, to works for tape and live electronics that combine traditional Iranian and Western instruments. Mashayekhi calls his compositional practice "Meta-X," referring to the sonic multiplicities present in his work (as contradictions of tonal/atonal, improvised/pre-defined, Persian/non-Persian) that unify within a single musical piece.

Works

Albums
 Mahoor Institute of Culture and Art, CD-145
Symphony No. 2 "Tehran", Op. 57Tehran Symphony Orchestra, Farhad Meshkat cond., live at Vahdat Hall, Tehran, Mar. 1977
Concerto for Violin and Orchestra, op. 96Tehran Symphony, Edo Mičič cond., Maziar Zahiroddini violin, live at Vahdat Hall, Tehran, Oct. 1998
"Nous ne verrons jamais les jardins de Nishapour", Op. 56NIRT Chamber Orchestra, Ivo Malec cond., Pari Barkeshli pianos, live at City Theatre Tehran, Tehran, Apr. 1978
Shahrzad: Nine Movements for Piano, Op. 115
Piano by Farimah Ghavamsadri
 An Old Fashioned Symphony for Computer (Symphony No. 3), Op. 76
 Symphony No. 4 (Zagros), Op. 103
 National Symphony Orchestra of Ukraine, conducted by Vladimir Sirenko
 Symphony No. 5 (Persian), Op. 112
 National Symphony Orchestra of Ukraine, conducted by Vladimir Sirenko

 Symphony No. 8 for Piano and Orchestra
 Piano: Farimah Ghavamsadri; National Symphony Orchestra of Ukraine, conducted by Vladimir Sirenko
 Music for Piano
 Piano: Farimah Ghavamsadri
 Happy Electronic Sounds

 Ravi-Azar-Kimia music Institute
 White Cactus

Books
 Modal Counterpoint
 Tonal Counterpoint: Bach Composition
 Harmony: Classical Composition
 All Those Years without Memory

See also 
 Iranian Orchestra for New Music
 University of Music and Performing Arts Vienna

References

Iranian classical composers
Iranian conductors (music)
Living people
People from Tehran
21st-century conductors (music)
Year of birth missing (living people)
Barbad award winners